Metroland may refer to:
 Metro-land, an informal name for a suburban area north-west of London, England served by the Metropolitan Line
 Metro-land (1973 film), a BBC TV documentary (1973) by Sir John Betjeman about the area
 Metroland (novel), a book by Julian Barnes where the subject comes from that part of London
 Metroland (film), a 1997 film based on the Julian Barnes novel
 Metroland (soundtrack), the soundtrack by Mark Knopfler
 Metroland Media Group, a publisher of daily and community newspapers in Canada
 "Metroland", a song by Orchestral Manoeuvres in the Dark from the album English Electric
 Metroland (newspaper), a defunct alternative newsweekly published in Albany, New York, whose editorial staff largely formed its successor The Alt
 Metroland, a former theme park in the MetroCentre complex in Gateshead, England